Dominic Ryan (born 28 March 1990) is an Irish former professional rugby union player who last played for Leicester Tigers. He was a back row player, playing at predominantly openside or blindside flanker.

During his first year in the Leinster academy, Ryan made his senior debut for the province in the Celtic League in late 2009. He made his first appearance in the Heineken Cup against Saracens in January 2011, scoring two tries. Ryan was selected as part of the Ireland Wolfhounds squad to face Scotland A and England Saxons, his first call-up to senior international duty.

Ryan was included in the senior national squad for the 2014 Autumn internationals, making his debut starting at blindside flanker against Georgia on 16 November 2014.

On 1 June 2017, it was announced that Ryan had joined English Premiership side Leicester Tigers. In October 2017, having made four appearances for Leicester, Ryan was stood down following repeated concussions. Ryan announced his retirement in September 2018 due to concussion.

References

External links
Leinster profile
Leicester profile
Ireland profile
Ireland Wolfhounds profile
Ireland U20 profile

Living people
1990 births
People educated at Gonzaga College
Irish rugby union players
Leinster Rugby players
Ireland international rugby union players
Leicester Tigers players
Irish expatriate rugby union players
Expatriate rugby union players in England
Irish expatriate sportspeople in England
Ireland Wolfhounds international rugby union players
Lansdowne Football Club players
Rugby union flankers
Rugby union players from Dublin (city)